Pterocarpus pedatus is a taxonomic synonym of Pterocarpus macrocarpus that may refer to:

Pterocarpus pedatus 
Pterocarpus pedatus

References

pedatus